
Gmina Kosakowo is a rural gmina (administrative district) in Puck County, Pomeranian Voivodeship, in northern Poland.

The gmina contains part of the protected area called Coastal Landscape Park.

Villages
Gmina Kosakowo contains the villages and settlements of Dębogórze, Dębogórze-Wybudowanie, Kazimierz, Kosakowo, Mechelinki, Mosty, Pierwoszyno, Pierwoszyńskie Pustki, Pogórze, Rewa, Stefanowo, Suchy Dwór and Zaklęty Zamek.

Neighbouring gminas
Gmina Kosakowo is bordered by the towns of Gdynia and Rumia, and by the gmina of Puck.

Nature protection

 Communal Association of Municipalities "Dolina Redy i Chylonki"
 Coastal Landscape Park
 Nature Reserve "Mechelińskie Łąki"

References
Polish official population figures 2006

Kosakowo
Puck County